Larry Hefner is a former linebacker in the National Football League.

Biography
Hefner was born Larry Douglas Hefner on August 2, 1949 in Charlotte, North Carolina. He attended North Mecklenburg High School in Huntersville, North Carolina.

Career
Hefner was drafted by the Green Bay Packers in the fourteenth round of the 1972 NFL Draft and played four seasons with the team. He played at the collegiate level at Clemson University. He played in 34 games (starting three games) for the Green Bay Packers as linebacker from 1972 thru 1975.

See also
List of Green Bay Packers players

References

1949 births
Players of American football from Charlotte, North Carolina
Green Bay Packers players
American football linebackers
Clemson Tigers football players
Living people